John Andrew Hummel (January 26, 1951 – July 19, 2010) was an American bassist and singer-songwriter best known as the bass player of Big Star.

Background and career
Hummel was born January 26, 1951, in Valley Forge, Pennsylvania, to John Vernon and Barbara Walker Hummel, who was crowned Miss America in 1947. He was raised in Memphis, Tennessee, and graduated in 1969 from Memphis University School. 

Hummel became good friends with Chris Bell during high school, and the pair frequently performed along with several other musicians, including drummer Jody Stephens, whom they had known since junior high school, in a band known as Icewater. In 1971, Bell asked singer Alex Chilton to join him, Hummel, and Stephens in a group that would eventually be named Big Star. 

Hummel recorded with Big Star on two of their three albums, #1 Record and Radio City. Hummel contributed as bass player as well as writer on "The India Song" on #1 Record. On the Radio City album, he wrote "Way Out West" and co-wrote on "Life Is White", "What's Going Ahn", "Back of a Car", and "Daisy Glaze". 

After the release of Radio City, Hummel faced the choice of staying with the band and dropping out of university, or leaving the band and finishing college. Ultimately, he chose college, and went on to earn a B.A. in English Literature from Rhodes College in Memphis in 1974, planning on a career in teaching. Hummel again returned to school and earned an associate degree in Mechanical Engineering Technology from State Technical Institute at Memphis in 1978. In 1999, he earned an MBA in Finance from the University of Dallas. 

Hummel later moved to Fort Worth, Texas, in 1978. He was a 30-year employee of Lockheed Martin. He and Patti Martin were married November 3, 1979. They had three children: a daughter, Cady, and two sons, Drew and Walker. 

Big Star reunited in the mid-1990s without Chris Bell, who had died in a car crash in 1978. Hummel also declined to take part, though in March 2010, he played at a special performance at SXSW in honor of Alex Chilton, who had died suddenly just three days prior. 

Three months later, Hummel died of cancer, on July 19, 2010.

Discography

Albums
Studio albums
#1 Record (Ardent/Stax, 1972)
Radio City (Ardent/Stax, 1974)

References

1951 births
2010 deaths
University of Dallas alumni
Songwriters from Pennsylvania
American male singers
Big Star members
Power pop musicians
20th-century American bass guitarists
20th-century American singers
People from Chester County, Pennsylvania
Singers from Pennsylvania
Guitarists from Pennsylvania